Paper Kite Productions is an American film and television production company founded by actress and producer Amy Poehler. It is known for producing the series The Mighty B!, Broad City, Difficult People, Making It, Russian Doll, and Duncanville.

Filmography

Television

Films

References

Mass media companies established in 2002
Film production companies of the United States
Television production companies of the United States